Guglielmo Morisetti (9 October 1882 – 25 November 1967) was an Italian cyclist. He competed in three events at the 1908 Summer Olympics. In the semi-final of the  Match Sprint event, Morisetti placed two bike lengths behind heat 4 winner, Clarence Kingsbury, so did not advance to the final. In the  event, Morisetti placed third in heat one of open qualifying, and did not advance to the final. In the  event, Morisetti placed fourth in his qualifying heat, behind Arthur J. Denny (first), Charles Avrillon (second), and Gustaf Westerberg; only Denny advanced to the event final.

References

External links
 

1882 births
1967 deaths
Sportspeople from the Province of Verbano-Cusio-Ossola
Italian male cyclists
Olympic cyclists of Italy
Cyclists at the 1908 Summer Olympics
Cyclists from Piedmont